The Society of Architectural Historians of Great Britain (SAHGB) is a United Kingdom learned society for people interested in the history of architecture.

Purpose 

The Society exists to encourage interest in the history of architecture, to enable the exchange and discussion of ideas related to this. The Society has no official location and its activities cover the United Kingdom. The Society also represents the interests of UK architectural history to governmental and non-governmental bodies within the education and heritage fields. The Society specifically avoids conservation issues.

Architectural History is the main journal of the society. It is published each autumn and members of SAHBG receive a copy. There is also a newsletter for members.

History 

The foundation of the Society was prompted in 1955 by Turpin Bannister in discussion with Frank Jenkins, a British architect and scholar who worked with Bannister at the University of Illinois in the United States. Initially it was conceived as being a chapter of the American Society of Architectural Historians partly because Bannister had been a founder-member in 1940. However, it was decided in 1956 that the Society should be independent. The early members were mainly architects and teachers. The Chairmen of the first meetings were Bruce Allsopp and William A. Singleton, the latter affiliated with the York Institute of Architectural Study.

See also 
 Royal Institute of British Architects

References

External links 
  of the SAHGB

Society of Architectural Historians of Great Britain archives at John Rylands Library, Manchester.

Architecture in the United Kingdom
Architecture organisations based in the United Kingdom
Architectural history
Historical societies of the United Kingdom
Charities based in England
Organizations established in 1955
1955 establishments in the United Kingdom
Heritage organisations in the United Kingdom
Learned societies of the United Kingdom